Instinto Coletivo Ao Vivo is the fourth album by Brazilian band O Rappa and their first Live album. It was produced by Tom Capone and O Rappa except "Ninguém Regula A América" which features and is also produced by Sepultura and "Instinto Coletivo" which features and is also mixed by Asian Dub Foundation. It is distributed through Warner Music.

Track listing

Disc 1
"Intro" - 1:28
"Tumulto" (from Rappa Mundi) - 3:42
"Se Não Avisar O Bicho Pega" (from Lado B Lado A) - 4:17
"Miséria S.A." – (from Rappa Mundi) 3:05
"Todo Camburão Tem Um Pouco De Navio Negreiro" (from O Rappa) – 11:34
"O Homem Amarelo" (from Lado B Lado A) - 4:40
"Minha Alma (A Paz Que Eu Não Quero)" (from Lado B Lado A) - 5:39
"Cristo E Oxalá" (from Lado B Lado A) - 5:15
"Hey Joe" (from Rappa Mundi) - 5:32
"Nó de Fumaça" (from Lado B Lado A) - 3:48
"Homem Bomba" (from Rappa Mundi) - 8:16
"Me Deixa" (from Lado B Lado A) - 3:55
"Vapor Barato" (from Rappa Mundi) - 7:05

Disc 2
"Lado B Lado A" (from Lado B Lado A) - 6:15
"A Feira" (from Rappa Mundi) - 3:50
"Ilê Ayê" (from Rappa Mundi) - 4:16
"Ninguém Regula A América" – 4:18
"Milagre" – 5:17
"Instinto Coletivo" - 5:06
"Fica Doido Varrido" - 4:37
"R.A.M." (from O Rappa) - 4:51

Personnel 
O Rappa
 Marcelo Falcão - lead vocals, rhythm guitar	
 Xandão - lead guitar  (acoustic on "Instinto Coletivo"), backing vocals
 Lauro Farias - bass, backing vocals
 Marcelo Lobato - keyboards, Fender Rhodes, theremin, backing vocals; air FX on  "Ninguém Regula a América", drums on "Milagre"	
 Marcelo Yuka - drums  (except "Ninguém Regula a América" and "Milagre"); electronic drum  (on "Ninguém Regula a América"); vocals  (on "Instinto Coletivo")	
Músicos convidados	
Additional musicians
 Bidinho - trumpet on "Instinto Coletivo"	
 Paulo Marcio - trumpet on "Instinto Coletivo"	
 Negralha - scratches	
 Dj Negralha - scratches and vocals	
 Eduardo Lyra - percussion
 Welington Soares - percussion

References

O Rappa albums
2001 live albums